Emmanuel "Manny" Sanchez is an American Democratic Party politician currently serving as a member of the Connecticut House of Representatives from the 24th district, which includes parts of New Britain and Newington, since 2021. Sanchez was first elected in 2020 over Republican Alden Russell. Sanchez currently serves as Ranking Member of the house Labor and Public Employees Committee, as well as a member of the Appropriations Committee and Education Committee.

References

Living people
Democratic Party members of the Connecticut House of Representatives
People from New Britain, Connecticut
21st-century American politicians
Year of birth missing (living people)